What's Next to the Moon is a solo album by Mark Kozelek, released on January 10, 2001. The album is composed entirely of drastically rearranged acoustic covers of Bon Scott-era AC/DC songs. The album follows the release of his debut solo EP Rock 'n' Roll Singer, which also features three AC/DC covers: "Rock 'n' Roll Singer," "You Ain't Got a Hold on Me," and "Bad Boy Boogie." The versions of "Rock 'n' Roll Singer" and "Bad Boy Boogie" on this album are different from the versions on the EP.

Track listing
 "Up to My Neck in You" (from Powerage, 1978) – 2:41
 "Love at First Feel" (from Love at First Feel, 1976) – 2:15
 "Love Hungry Man" (from Highway to Hell, 1979) – 1:43
 "Bad Boy Boogie" (from Let There Be Rock, 1978) – 4:51
 "What's Next to the Moon" (from Powerage, 1978) – 3:37
 "Walk All Over You" (from Highway to Hell, 1979) – 3:00
 "You Ain't Got a Hold on Me" (from High Voltage, 1975) – 3:17
 "If You Want Blood" (from Highway to Hell, 1979) – 2:40
 "Riff Raff" (from Powerage, 1978) – 2:50
 "Rock 'n' Roll Singer" (from T.N.T., 1975) – 3:33

Notes
 All songs written by Bon Scott, Angus Young, and Malcolm Young.

2001 albums
Mark Kozelek albums
AC/DC tribute albums
Albums produced by Mark Kozelek